The Vermont Foodbank is the largest anti-hunger organization in Vermont.

Started in 1986, the Vermont Foodbank provides charitable food to more than 280 food shelves, meal sites, shelters, senior centers and after-school programs throughout Vermont. According to their website, the Foodbank distributed more than 8.2 million pounds of nutritious food to as many as 86,000 hungry Vermonters in 2013.

See also

 List of food banks

References

External links
Vermont Foodbank

Food banks in Vermont
Non-profit organizations based in Vermont